Scott MacLeod (born May 17, 1959) is a Canadian retired professional ice hockey player.

Early life
Born in Vancouver, British Columbia, Canada, MacLeod played junior hockey in the Western Hockey League with the Brandon Wheat Kings, New Westminster Bruins, and Calgary Wranglers. He was selected to play with Team Canada at the 1979 World Junior Ice Hockey Championships.

Career 
MacLeod began his professional career in 1979 with Oji Seishi in the Japan Ice Hockey League. In 1983, he joined the Salt Lake Golden Eagles for the Central Hockey League's final season of play, where he won the league's scoring title, and then stayed with the team for two more seasons in the International Hockey League, winning the IHL's scoring race both seasons.

MacLeod then moved to Europe in 1986 and signed for EV Landshut of the Eishockey-Bundesliga in Germany. After one season, he moved to EC Hedos München of the 2nd Bundesliga for two seasons before joining HC Merano of Italy's Italian Hockey League - Serie A. He then played two games with EHC Biel in the Swiss National League A during the 1990–91 season before retiring from hockey.

Personal life 
MacLeod's son, Wade, played professional ice hockey in the American Hockey League for the Springfield Falcons and Toronto Marlies.

Awards and honours

References

External links

1959 births
Living people
Brandon Wheat Kings players
Calgary Wranglers (WHL) players
Canadian ice hockey centres
EHC Biel players
EV Landshut players
HC Merano players
New Westminster Bruins players
Oji Eagles players
Salt Lake Golden Eagles (CHL) players
Salt Lake Golden Eagles (IHL) players
Ice hockey people from Vancouver
Canadian expatriate ice hockey players in Germany
Canadian expatriate ice hockey players in Switzerland
Canadian expatriate ice hockey players in the United States